Gymnoscelis, the pugs, is a large genus of moths in the family Geometridae described by Paul Mabille in 1868.

Description
Palpi porrect (extending forward), where the second joint clothed with hair and reaching beyond the frontal tuft. Third joint prominent. Antennae of male ciliated. Hind tibia with a terminal spur pair, and rarely with a very minute medial pair. Abdomen with slight dorsal crests. Forewings with vein 3 from close to angle of cell. Vein 5 from middle of discocellulars and vein 6 from upper angle. Veins 10 and 11 stalked, and vein 10 anastomosing (fusing) with veins 7 to 9 to form areole. Vein 11 anastomosing with vein 12 as well. Hindwings with veins 3 and 4 from angle of cell and vein 5 from middle of discocellulars. Veins 6 and 7 from upper angle and vein 8 anastomosing with vein 7 to beyond middle of cell.

Species
Gymnoscelis acutipennis
Gymnoscelis admixtaria
Gymnoscelis aenictopa
Gymnoscelis albicaudata
Gymnoscelis ammocyma
Gymnoscelis anaxia
Gymnoscelis argyropasta
Gymnoscelis barbuti
Gymnoscelis bassa
Gymnoscelis biangulata
Gymnoscelis birivulata
Gymnoscelis boninensis
Gymnoscelis bryodes
Gymnoscelis bryoscopa
Gymnoscelis caelestis
Gymnoscelis callichlora
Gymnoscelis carneata
Gymnoscelis celaenephes
Gymnoscelis celebensis
Gymnoscelis chlorobapta
Gymnoscelis concinna
Gymnoscelis confusata
Gymnoscelis conjurata
Gymnoscelis coquina
Gymnoscelis crassata
Gymnoscelis crassifemur
Gymnoscelis daniloi
Gymnoscelis deleta
Gymnoscelis delocyma
Gymnoscelis derogata
Gymnoscelis desiderata
Gymnoscelis distatica
Gymnoscelis ectochloros
Gymnoscelis erymna
Gymnoscelis esakii
Gymnoscelis exangulata
Gymnoscelis fasciata
Gymnoscelis festiva
Gymnoscelis fragilis
Gymnoscelis grisea
Gymnoscelis harterti
Gymnoscelis holocapna
Gymnoscelis holoprasia
Gymnoscelis idiograpta
Gymnoscelis imparatalis
Gymnoscelis inexpressa
Gymnoscelis ischnophylla
Gymnoscelis kennii
Gymnoscelis latipennis
Gymnoscelis lavella
Gymnoscelis lindbergi
Gymnoscelis lophopus
Gymnoscelis melaninfra
Gymnoscelis merochyta
Gymnoscelis mesophoena
Gymnoscelis montgomeryi
Gymnoscelis nepotalis
Gymnoscelis nigrescens
Gymnoscelis oblenita
Gymnoscelis olsoufieffae
Gymnoscelis oribiensis
Gymnoscelis pallidirufa
Gymnoscelis perpusilla
Gymnoscelis phoenicopus
Gymnoscelis poecilimon
Gymnoscelis protracta
Gymnoscelis prouti
Gymnoscelis pseudotibialis
Gymnoscelis roseifascia
Gymnoscelis rubricata
Gymnoscelis rufifasciata
Gymnoscelis sara
Gymnoscelis semialbida
Gymnoscelis silvicola
Gymnoscelis smithersi
Gymnoscelis spodias
Gymnoscelis tanaoptila
Gymnoscelis taprobanica
Gymnoscelis tenera
Gymnoscelis tibialis
Gymnoscelis transapicalis
Gymnoscelis tristrigosa
Gymnoscelis tylocera
Gymnoscelis yurikae

References

 , 2009, New and interesting geometrid moths from the Cape Verde islands (Lepidoptera: Geometridae). SHILAP Revista de Lepidopterología 37 (146): 241–247.
 , 2009: 3. Contribution à la connaissance des Lépidoptères Hétérocères de Tahiti Gymnoscelis barbuti n. sp. (Lepidoptera: Geometridae). Bulletin de la Société Entomologique de Mulhouse 65 (3): 41–42.
  1994: New Eupithecia, Gymnoscelis and Chloroclystis species from Africa and Arabia (Lepidoptera, Geometridae: Larentiinae). Acta Zoologica Academiae Scientiarum Hungaricae 40 (3): 265–271.

External links

 
Eupitheciini